Miss World Ecuador 2019, the 7th edition of the Miss World Ecuador was held on April 27, 2019, in Guayaquil, Ecuador. Nicol Ocles from Imbabura crowned her successor María Auxiliadora Idrovo as Miss World Ecuador 2019. María Auxiliadora Idrovo competed at Miss World 2019. Among the finalists, the representatives to Miss Supranational, Miss Grand, and Miss Intercontinental were selected.

Results

Placements

International Representation

Fast Track

Contestants

Notes

Debuts

 U.S. Ecuadorian community

Returns

Last compete in:

2016 
  Bolívar
2017 
 Chimborazo
 Galápagos
 Orellana

Withdrawals

  Tungurahua

Replacements

  Azuay - Samantha Argudo
 El Oro - Tahíz Zambrano

Did not compete

 Cotopaxi - Johanna Pamela Bravo Chasillacta
 Guayaquil  - Ámar Silvana Pacheco Ibarra

Crossovers

Joselin Guizado competed at Reina de Azogues 2017 where she placed as Virreina (1st runner-up).
Cinthia López was Reina de Pallatanga 2018 and Reina de Chimborazo 2018
Pamela Bravo competed at Reina de Latacunga 2016 where she was unplaced.
Ruth Maldonado was Virreina de Machala 2017 (1st Runner-up) and Virreina de El Oro 2018 (1st Runner-up).
Sugey Delgado was Reina de Esmeraldas 2012.
Paola Zamora was 4th Runner-up at Reina de Guayaquil 2016.
Naomi Cárdenas competed at Reina de Ibarra 2018 where she was unplaced.
Jaidy Saavedra competed at Reina de Calvas 2017 where she placed as Virreina (1st runner-up).
Fernanda Yépez competed at Miss Ecuador 2018 where she placed in Top 10.
Andrea Quito was Reina de Macas 2017.
Camila Valencia was 3rd Runner-up at Reina de Santo Domingo 2017.

References

Beauty pageants in Ecuador
2019
2019 beauty pageants